Bertrand Isidore Traoré (born 6 September 1995) is a Burkinabè professional footballer who plays as a forward for Premier League club Aston Villa and the Burkina Faso national team.

After beginning his career at Auxerre, he finished his development at Chelsea, and made his debut in a one-and-a-half-year loan at Vitesse in the Eredivisie. After a season in the Premier League with Chelsea, he was loaned back to the Netherlands to play for Ajax in 2016, and a year later signed for Lyon for €10 million.

A full international from the age of 15, Traoré represented Burkina Faso at four Africa Cup of Nations tournaments.

Club career

Chelsea
In August 2010, it was reported that Traoré had joined the Chelsea Academy from French club Auxerre, rejecting Manchester United in the process.

In January 2011, however, Traoré had not yet signed for the club, and in January 2012 the club confirmed that Traoré was not and had never been a Chelsea player, but had appeared once for the club's youth team in a friendly as part of a six-week trial earlier in the season. On 17 July 2013, however, he made his debut, as a trialist, in a pre-season friendly against the Singha All Stars.

On 31 October 2013, Traoré officially signed a four-and-half-year contract with Chelsea. He signed a contract for Chelsea's senior team in December 2013, and completed the transfer on 1 January 2014.

Loan to Vitesse
On 2 January 2014, Traoré signed on loan for Eredivisie side Vitesse. On 26 January, he made his debut, coming on in the 67th minute for fellow Chelsea loanee Lucas Piazon. On 29 March 2014, Traoré scored his first goal, against Heerenveen. He replaced Mike Havenaar after half-time; in the 67th minute, he scored Vitesse's second goal of the game which was assisted by fellow Chelsea loanee, Christian Atsu. On 6 April, Traoré scored his second goal of the season in a home match against Ajax which ended in a 1–1 draw. On 12 April, Traoré put Vitesse in the lead for the first time in the match against Cambuur, although Vitesse lost the game 4–3 in the end.

On 7 July 2014, it was confirmed that Traoré would stay at Vitesse on loan for the 2014–15 season. Traoré scored his first goal of the season in a 4–1 victory over Willem II on 18 October. While he primarily played on the right wing during his first loan to Vitesse, around December, Traoré made the switch from the right to being the lone striker up top leading up to him scoring on 14 December in a 1–1 draw against Groningen. In the following games, Traoré scored his first brace in a 4–0 win over Ajax in the KNVB Cup, then three days later scored his first league brace in a 3–0 win over Heracles.

2015–16 season: Promotion to first team

On 22 June 2015, Traoré received a work permit and therefore clearance to play for Chelsea for the 2015–16 season onwards. He was given the number 14 shirt, previously worn by André Schürrle. On 16 September, Traoré made his Chelsea debut in a 4–0 victory against Maccabi Tel Aviv in the UEFA Champions League group stage, coming on as a 77th-minute substitute for Ruben Loftus-Cheek. His Premier League debut came on 5 December, playing the final seven minutes of a 0–1 home loss to AFC Bournemouth.

Traoré scored four goals in five matches in early 2016. On 31 January 2016, Traoré scored his first Chelsea goal in a 5–1 victory at Milton Keynes Dons in the FA Cup, confirming the result five minutes after coming on in place of Diego Costa. Two weeks later, after again replacing Costa, he scored his first Premier League goal in a game of the same result against Newcastle United. On 5 March, with Costa rested ahead of a Champions League game, Traoré was given a start in a home Premier League match against Stoke City and scored from 20 yards to open a 1–1 draw, but his performance was described as "mixed" due to "failing to control the ball in the box on a couple of occasions and being caught offside needlessly".

Loan to Ajax
On 12 August 2016, Traoré signed a new three-year contract with Chelsea and joined Ajax on loan for the 2016–17 campaign, which reunited him with former Vitesse manager, Peter Bosz. On the following day, Traoré made his league debut off the bench, replacing Kasper Dolberg in a 2–2 home draw against Roda JC. On 16 August, Traoré made his first start in a Champions League play-off round against Rostov, a 1–1 draw.

On 15 September, Traoré scored his first Ajax goal in a Europa League group stage tie against Panathinaikos, scoring Ajax's equaliser in a 2–1 win. Just over a week later, he scored his first league goal in a 5–1 win over PEC Zwolle.

On 3 November 2016, Bosz criticised Traoré in an interview stating that there's "nothing wrong with his attitude, but his form is not good".

Traoré scored four goals in the 2016–17 UEFA Europa League, including two goals in the first leg of the semi-final against his future club Olympique Lyonnais. He played every minute of the final, with Ajax losing to Manchester United 2–0.

Lyon

On 26 June 2017, Traoré signed for Ligue 1 side Olympique Lyonnais on a five-year contract for an initial transfer fee of €10 million (£8.8 million), plus potential add-ons. Chelsea reportedly inserted a buy-back clause into Traoré's contract and would receive 15 per cent of any profit made by Lyon on the fee should they sell Traoré in the future. Chelsea would also have first refusal should Traoré move again.

In his first season in France, Traoré formed an attacking trio with Mariano Díaz and Memphis Depay, all of whom reached double figures in league goals. He was sidelined with knee ligament injury from November 2017 until January, when he returned and scored a free kick for the reserve team in a 3–2 home loss to SC Schiltigheim in the fourth tier.

In the 2020 Coupe de la Ligue Final on 31 July, the last match in the competition, Traoré was the only player to miss in the penalty shootout as Paris Saint-Germain won 6–5 after a goalless draw; his attempt was saved by Keylor Navas.

Aston Villa 
On 19 September 2020, Traoré signed for Premier League side Aston Villa for an undisclosed fee, believed to be £17 million. He scored on his debut five days later, in a 3–0 away victory in the EFL Cup against Bristol City. On 20 December, he scored his first Premier League goal in four years in a 3–0 away victory over local rivals West Bromwich Albion.
On the 23 May 2021, the final day of the Premier League season, Traore scored the first goal at Villa Park with fans in attendance since the start of the COVID-19 pandemic in a 2–1 win over former club Chelsea, in which he also won the penalty that Anwar El Ghazi converted for the winner.

On 22 August 2022, Traoré signed for Süper Lig club İstanbul Başakşehir on a season-long loan. He was recalled early from that loan on 31 January 2023.

International career
Traoré participated at the 2009 FIFA U-17 World Cup and 2011 African U-17 Championship, and helped Burkina Faso beat Rwanda 2–1 in the continental final.

At the age of 15, Traoré made his debut for the Burkina Faso senior national team on 3 September 2011 in a friendly match against Equatorial Guinea. He made his first appearance at an Africa Cup of Nations finals in the 2012 edition, becoming one of the youngest players to do so. He came on as a 66th-minute substitute for Narcisse Yaméogo in the 2–1 loss to Sudan in their final group stage match with Burkina Faso already eliminated from the tournament after losing their first two group stage matches.

Traoré scored his first goal for the senior national team on 14 August 2013, opening the scoring in a 2–1 friendly away win over Morocco. At the 2015 Africa Cup of Nations, he played all three of the team's games in another group stage exit, starting the first two.

Burkina Faso came third at the 2017 Africa Cup of Nations in Morocco. Traoré scored in a 2–0 win over Guinea-Bissau in Marrakesh, sending his country to the quarter-finals.

Personal life
Traoré's father, Feu Traoré Isaï, was also a footballer. He played for RC Bobo and also represented Burkina Faso at international level. Bertrand is the youngest of four children. The second-eldest, Alain, is also a footballer. He is the cousin of Shakhtar striker Lassina Traoré.

After moving to Chelsea's academy, Traoré was educated at Whitgift School. Traoré is Catholic.

Career statistics

Club

International

Scores and results list Burkina Faso's goal tally first, score column indicates score after each Traoré goal.

Honours
Ajax
UEFA Europa League runner-up: 2016–17
Lyon

 Coupe de la Ligue runner-up: 2019–20

Burkina Faso U17
African U-17 Championship: 2011

Burkina Faso
Africa Cup of Nations bronze: 2017

Individual
UEFA Europa League Squad of the Season: 2016–17

References

External links

 Bertrand Traoré at Voetbal International 
 

1995 births
Living people
People from Bobo-Dioulasso
Burkinabé footballers
Association football forwards
AJ Auxerre players
Chelsea F.C. players
SBV Vitesse players
AFC Ajax players
Olympique Lyonnais players
Aston Villa F.C. players
İstanbul Başakşehir F.K. players
Eredivisie players
Premier League players
Ligue 1 players
Championnat National 2 players
Süper Lig players
Burkina Faso youth international footballers
Burkina Faso international footballers
2012 Africa Cup of Nations players
2015 Africa Cup of Nations players
2017 Africa Cup of Nations players
2021 Africa Cup of Nations players
Burkinabé expatriate footballers
Burkinabé expatriate sportspeople in France
Burkinabé expatriate sportspeople in the Netherlands
Burkinabé expatriate sportspeople in England
Burkinabé expatriate sportspeople in Turkey
Expatriate footballers in England
Expatriate footballers in France
Expatriate footballers in the Netherlands
Expatriate footballers in Turkey
People educated at Whitgift School
Burkinabé Roman Catholics
21st-century Burkinabé people